Robin Hood is the fictional protagonist of Walt Disney Productions series' 21st animated feature film Robin Hood (1973). Robin Hood is voiced by Shakespearean and Tony Award winning actor Brian Bedford. The film is based on the legends of Robin Hood and Reynard the fox, a 12th-century Alsatian fairy tale character, but uses anthropomorphic animals rather than people. The story follows the adventures of Robin Hood, Little John and the inhabitants of Nottingham as they fight against the excessive taxation of Prince John, and Robin Hood wins the hand of Maid Marian.

In Robin Hood 
Robin Hood is the protagonist of the film Robin Hood (1973). He does not see himself as a criminal but as a hero. Although Robin Hood is often shown as an outlaw who chooses to rob from the rich to help the poor people, in this animated version, he is shown mainly attacking Prince John and his agents, who have impoverished Nottingham with high taxes. Robin Hood and Little John steal the tax caravans and give it back to the peasants while trying to avoid capture by both Prince John and the Sheriff of Nottingham. He is also in love with Maid Marian.

Maid Marian reveals she and Robin were childhood sweethearts but they have not seen one another for years. Prince John is hosting an archery tournament, and the winner will receive a kiss from Maid Marian. Robin decides to participate in the tournament disguised as a stork whilst Little John disguises himself as the Duke of Chutney to get near Prince John. Robin wins the tournament, but Prince John exposes him and sentences him to death despite Maid Marian's pleas. However, thanks to Little John, Robin escapes into the woods with Marian.

As Robin and Maid Marian enjoy their reunion, the townsfolk have a troubadour festival spoofing Prince John, describing him as the "Phony King of England", and the song soon becomes popular with John's soldiers. A paltry coin gets deposited into the poor box at Friar Tuck's church, which gets seized by the Sheriff. Friar Tuck lashes out at the Sheriff, to which he is quickly arrested. Prince John orders Friar Tuck hanged, knowing Robin Hood will come out of hiding to rescue his friend.

Robin and Little John sneak in, with Little John managing to free all of the prisoners whilst Robin steals Prince John's taxes, but Sir Hiss awakens to find Robin fleeing. Chaos follows as Robin and the others try to escape to Sherwood Forest. The Sheriff corners Robin after he returns to rescue Tagalong, a young rabbit. During the chase, Prince John's castle catches fire and the Sheriff figures he has Robin where he wants him, either to be captured, burned, or make a risky jump into the moat. Robin Hood elects to jump. Little John and Skippy fear Robin is lost, but he surfaces safely after using a reed as a breathing tube.

Later, King Richard returns to England, placing his brother, Sir Hiss and the Sheriff under arrest and allows his niece Maid Marian to marry Robin Hood, turning the former outlaw into an in-law.

Inspiration for the character
Medieval historian Andrew E. Larsen wrote that the inspiration for Disney's animated Robin Hood character was not actually the Robin Hood of literary and cinematic fame but instead was Reynard the fox, a 12th century Alsatian fairy tale character.  Larsen drew parallels between many of the characters from the animated film and characters in the Reynard tales, including the lion King Leo and the rooster Chaunticleer.  Disney was able to overcome concerns about Reynard being a crook and anti-authoritarian figure by turning him into the bandit Robin Hood.

Characteristics and physical appearance

Characteristics 
Robin Hood is a heroic outlaw who steals from the rich and gives to the poor. He is known for his mastery of archery as well as his talent for disguising himself. Despite being declared an outlaw, Robin Hood is a good and generous person at heart, and is beloved by the townspeople for his deeds.

Physical appearance 
Robin Hood is a slender red fox with brown eyes who wears a yellow hat with a red feather on it, but later changed to green, and wears green clothing and shoes.

Voice actor
Tony Award winning stage and Shakespearean actor Brian Bedford provided the voice of Robin Hood.  His voicing was acclaimed for giving "...the titular fox a pleasant blend of mischief and gracious dignity."

Popular reception
Cosmopolitan called Robin Hood "the sexiest animated fox ever to appear on screen".  Hollywood writer James Humphreys writing on his web site Cineramble discussed the evolution of Robin Hood in Cinema, and described the animated Robin Hood as a "...clear sign of just how universally effective Robin Hood is as a big screen hero."

Other appearances

Television 
Robin Hood appears as a recurring character in House of Mouse.

Theme parks 
Robin Hood is a member of the Long Lost Friends in Disneyland and other parks. The Long Lost Friends are characters that do not often appear for meet and greets. He also occasionally appears in Fantasyland alongside Little John, and Maid Marian.

Video games 
In Disney Universe, a costume of Robin Hood was available for the player in the game.

A townspeople with Robin Hood costume can be unlocked in Disney Infinity.

In the world builder game Disney Magic Kingdoms, Robin Hood appears as a limited time playable character.

Robin Hood appears as a playable character in Disney Heroes: Battle Mode.

References 

Adventure film characters
Anthropomorphic foxes
Comedy film characters
Male characters in animated films

Fictional gentleman thieves
Fictional archers
Fictional outlaws
Fictional vigilantes
Fictional swordfighters in films
Fictional foxes
Film characters introduced in 1973
Fictional English people
Walt Disney Animation Studios characters